Thiyagam is an Indian Tamil-language soap opera that aired Monday through Friday on Sun TV from 30 January 2012 to 30 August 2013 at 1:00PM IST for 550 episodes. The show starred Kaveri, Udhay and Rithiya. It was produced by Plan V Productions R. Raja and directed by A. Abdullah.

The serial went off on 30 August 2013, due to unexpected ratings where it was replaced by Plan V Production new project Ponnujal. It used to be top 3 in afternoon GEC Tamil from 2012 still June 2013.

A spin off series was made by then a different story and cast by the same production which replaced this show called Ponnunjal which aired from 3 September 2013 to 20 October 2016 by completing 940 episodes.

Plot
Thiyagam refers as  reflects the heroine for her sacrifices.
As a working lady, she sacrifices her life for her husband’s family has 3 unmarried sisters.

The story goes on about how she overcomes her problems in spite of hindrances from her mother in law. he is very careful with his husband's family. Thiygam tells the story where Mahalakshmi Thirumalai, who have 3 daughters called Abirami, Keerthi, and Sugundhi.

It tells about these daughters when they get married they face many hurdles with Sandhiya an arrogant woman who demand them to get separated and make them in fears at home. 
It tells about the sisters are reunited and protecting their family values and overcoming. In the climax scene, Sandhiya gets arrested for our masterminded plans, where the parents come to reunite with the family to be happy again.

Cast

Main cast
 Kaveri as Abirami Kalyan  
 Udhay as Kalyanam aka kalyan
 Rindhiya as Sandhiya

Supporting roles
 Dr.Srinath as Thirumalai
 Sabitha Anand as Mahalakshmi Thirumalai
 Suzane George as Sugundhi
 Durga as Periyanayaki
 Gowthami Vembunathan as Sivagami
 Keerthi as Abirami's sister
Birla Bose as Vinoth
Siva Kavitha as Akila
Vijay Anand as Vasanth
Saraswathi as kaveri/gowri
Ramki
C.H.Krishnaveni
 as Aiswarya
Jayandh 
Nagalaksmi
Aravind kathare
Azhaghu as Appasamy
--as Avant
A.Tamilkumaran as Gowri's father
Dhanalakshmi as Malliga.
Meenakshi as Meenakshi
Shobhana as Megala
Raja 
Vincent Roy as Gowdhan
Tinku
Adhthiya as Arivalagan
Boys Rajan
Rajkumar Manoharan
Jagan
Adhavan
Srilatha
Diana 
Master Basha
Padmini
Nandhini
Sundari Ganeshan

Title song
It was written by the famous lyricist Vairamuthu, composed by the famous music director Dhina. It captures the theme of the story with simple and effective words.

International broadcast
 It aired in the Indian state of Telangana on Gemini TV Dubbed in Telugu language as `Sangharshana`. It was aired Monday through Friday at 2:00 PM IST and ended its run on 21 June 2013 after airing 180 episodes. In India Tamil language in Velicham TV Monday to Friday at 6:00 pm.

References

External links
 Official Website 
 Sun TV on YouTube
 Sun TV Network 
 Sun Group 

Sun TV original programming
2012 Tamil-language television series debuts
Tamil-language television shows
2013 Tamil-language television series endings